Prantl is a German surname. Notable people with the surname include:

 Florian Prantl, Austrian luger
 Heribert Prantl (born 1953), German journalist and jurist
 Karl Prantl (1923–2010), Austrian sculptor
 Karl Anton Eugen Prantl (1849–1893), German botanist
 Karl von Prantl (1820–1888), German philosopher
 Werner Prantl, Austrian luger

See also
 Gertrude Grob-Prandl

German-language surnames
de:Prantl